Jackie Carson (born January 24, 1978) is an American basketball coach who is the head coach of the Furman Paladins women's team.

Head coaching record

References

External links
 Furman profile

1978 births
Living people
American women's basketball coaches
Bucknell Bison women's basketball coaches
Furman Paladins women's basketball coaches
Furman Paladins women's basketball players
James Madison Dukes women's basketball coaches
People from Woodbridge, Virginia